Liisa Anselmi-Dalton is an American politician and a former Democratic member of the Wyoming Senate, having represented District 12 from January 10, 2017, until January 4, 2021.

Career
Prior to her election to the Wyoming Senate, Anselmi-Dalton served on the Sweetwater County Travel and Tourism Board.  In 2013, Wyoming Governor Matt Mead appointed Anselmi-Dalton to the Wyoming Board of Tourism and was subsequently confirmed by the Senate.

Anselmi-Dalton manages several hotels in Rock Springs, Wyoming.

Elections

2016
When incumbent Democratic Senator Bernadine Craft announced her retirement, Anselmi-Dalton announced her candidacy for the seat.  Anselmi-Dalton ran unopposed for the Democratic nomination and was unopposed for the general election.

References

External links
Profile from Ballotpedia

Living people
Democratic Party Wyoming state senators
People from Rock Springs, Wyoming
Duke University School of Law alumni
University of Notre Dame alumni
Women state legislators in Wyoming
21st-century American politicians
21st-century American women politicians
Year of birth missing (living people)